Zoviet France (also known as :$OVIET:FRANCE:, Soviet France, :Zoviet-France: and latterly usually written as :zoviet*france:) are a music group from Newcastle upon Tyne in north east England. While often dissonant and made of industrial textures, their music also falls into the ambient music category. Formed in 1980, and remaining largely anonymous, the group has had a number of members; presently it consists of co-founder Ben Ponton and Mark Warren. Former members included Neil Ramshaw, Peter Jensen, Robin Storey (who now records as Rapoon), Lisa Hale, Paolo Di Paolo, Mark Spybey (who now records as Dead Voices on Air) and Andy Eardley. In 2005 Storey, Spybey and Eardley formed a new group, Reformed Faction.

The band participated in the early-eighties underground tape scene. The packaging of their releases was often unconventional, involving materials such as hessian, tar paper and aluminium foil.

Discography

Notable performances 
9 and 10 November 1990: two performances as part of the 'Ohrenschrauben' festival at Szene Wien, Austria. Later released on Vienna 1990 CD in 1991.
29 March 1993: The Leadmill, Sheffield. Later released as track 3 on What Is Not True CD in 1993.
30 March 1993: The Old Vic, Nottingham. Later released as tracks 1 & 2 on What Is Not True CD in 1993.
26 March 1996: Urban Aboriginals XI, Ballhaus, Berlin. Later released on in.version CD in 1996.
August 1996: Live studio recording by VPRO radio in Amsterdam. Later released on Mort Aux Vaches: Feedback CD in 1998.
29 February 2008: European premiere performance of John Cage's Variations VII with Atau Tanaka and Matt Wand, AV Festival, Baltic Centre for Contemporary Art, Gateshead, UK.

See also 
List of ambient music artists

References

External links

Jim's Music Pages: :zoviet*france, a fan site with discography

British ambient music groups
Musical groups from Newcastle upon Tyne
Musical groups established in 1980
British experimental musical groups
British industrial music groups
Mute Records artists
Soleilmoon artists
Cassette culture 1970s–1990s